Fear My Thoughts was a German melodic death metal band from Rheinfelden, founded in 1997. Their album Vulcanus was produced by Jacob Hansen and was released on January 15, 2007. In November 2009, the band announced that they were planning to split up; a farewell show was set for February 2010 in Lörrach, Germany.

Members

Current
Markus Ruf - guitar
Patrick Hagman - guitar
Bartosz Wojciechowski - bass
Norman Lonhard - drums
Martin Fischer - vocals (since 2007)

Former
Marco Allenstein - guitar
Lisa Graf - violin
Alexander Kovats - drums
Mathias Benedikt von Ockl - vocals (1998–2007)

Discography
Sapere Aude (EP, 1999)
23 (2001)
This Machine Runs on Fear (split, 2002)
Vitriol (2003)
The Great Collapse (2004)
Hell Sweet Hell (2005)
Smell Sweet Smell 2001-2002 (compilation, 2005)
Vulcanus (2007)
Isolation (2008)

References

External links 

 
 
 Fear My Thoughts at Century Media Records
 Fear My Thoughts at Lifeforce Records
 Fear My Thoughts at Let It Burn Records

German melodic death metal musical groups
Century Media Records artists
Musical groups established in 1998
Musical groups disestablished in 2010
Musical quintets